Down Hall is a large red brick merchant's folly in Barrow upon Humber in North Lincolnshire, England. Built in 1877 by JW Beeton, a willow merchant from Hull, the building originally served as both a grand house and a factory for the manufacture of coal baskets, chairs, and prams on its top floor and attic.

Beeton was an eccentric who paid his workers in distinctive octagonal tokens, and observed them cutting osiers from a panoramic view glass tower, (now removed,) on the roof of the building. It is alleged that he lined the drive to the hall with skulls removed from a Saxon burial ground which was disturbed during building.

Down Hall was built by John Sleight of Barrow, who said that the house was based on the calendar using the numbers seven, twenty-four, twelve, fifty-two and even three-hundred-and-sixty-five for numbers and measurements of doors, windows and other fittings. Sleight claimed that the effort of building a house to such eccentric specifications almost killed him.

References

 Lincs to the past

External links
"Barrow upon Humber" shonamcisaac.com; retrieved 7 April 2011
 recent auction details retrieved 22 May 2013

Country houses in Lincolnshire
Borough of North Lincolnshire